Sela pri Raki is a settlement southeast of Raka in the Municipality of Krško in eastern Slovenia. The area is part of the traditional region of Lower Carniola. It is now included in the Lower Sava Statistical Region.

Name
The name of the settlement was changed from Sela to Sela pri Raki in 1953.

References

External links
Sela pri Raki on Geopedia

Populated places in the Municipality of Krško